Straight Arrow Press (Straight Arrow Publishing Co., Inc.) was a publishing company that published the periodical Rolling Stone.

They operated a book publishing division in the 1970s in San Francisco, which published authors such as Oscar Zeta Acosta, Stewart Brand, Richard Brautigan, Bob Dylan, Jerry Garcia (with company founder Jann Wenner and Charles A. Reich), Hunter S. Thompson, William Bast, Roger L. Simon, and the Firesign Theatre.

Partial bibliography
Autobiography of a Brown Buffalo, Oscar Zeta Acosta, 1972
The Revolt of the Cockroach People, Oscar Zeta Acosta, 1973
Time Zone, Sätty, 1973 (published in association with Robert Briggs), 
Suburbia, Bill Owens, 1973
Hollywood Babylon (distributed by Simon & Schuster), 1975

External links
 Jann Wenner starts Rolling Stone with "a mailing list and a corporate name (Straight Arrow Publishing)"
Chicago Tribune news article from 1985

Magazine publishing companies of the United States
Book publishing companies based in San Francisco
Companies based in San Francisco
Culture in the San Francisco Bay Area